Sebastian Fitz (born 12 August 1979) is a German former professional tennis player.

A left-handed player, Fitz reached a career high singles ranking of 257 in the world. His only ATP Tour singles main draw appearance came as a lucky loser at the 2004 Nottingham Open, where he was beaten in the first round by Victor Hănescu in three sets. He made the second qualifying round of the 2005 Australian Open.

Fitz has a younger sister, Christina, who also competed on the professional tennis tour.

ITF Futures titles

Singles: (3)

Doubles: (6)

References

External links
 
 

1979 births
Living people
German male tennis players